A monk's spade (also), also called a Shaolin Spade, is a Chinese pole weapon consisting of a long pole with a flat spade-like blade on one end and a smaller crescent shaped blade on the other. Neither blade was designed to be sharpened. In old China, Buddhist monks often carried spades (shovels) with them when travelling. This served two purposes: if they came upon a corpse on the road, they could properly bury it with Buddhist rites, and the large implement could serve as a weapon for defence against bandits. The crescent was designed as defense against small to medium-sized predators such as wild dogs and leopards. The way it is used is to hold the animal at bay by positioning the crescent at the animal's neck and pushing it away if needed. Over time, they were stylised into the monk's spade weapon.

See also
 Khakkhara
 Sasumata

References
 Holmes Welch, The Practice of Chinese Buddhism 1900—1950, Harvard University Press, 1973

Blade weapons
Chinese melee weapons
Polearms
Ritual weapons
Honorary weapons
Ceremonial weapons